Josias Philip Hoffman (commonly known as Sias Hoffman) (1807 – 1879) was a South African Boer statesman, and was the chairman of the Provisional Government and later the first State President of the Orange Free State, in office from 1854 to 1855.

Career

Hoffman was one of the representatives of the Smithfield District in the Orange River Sovereignty during the negotiations between Boers and British about the independence of the territory. He acted as chairman of the Boer deputation in the negotiations and signed the Orange River Convention of 23 February 1854 in that capacity.

He was first appointed chairman of the Provisional Government (23 February – 29 March 1854) and after a short intermezzo as chairman of the Volksraad he was first elected Acting State President (18 April – 15 June) and eventually the first substantial State President of the Orange Free State.

Both Hoffman and his State Secretary J. Groenendaal were cripples, reason for their government to quickly gain the nickname 'the crippled government'.

Hoffman's term in office was short-lived, just under one year, and ended with a political incident. As a gesture of good faith, Hoffman had given a present of a keg of gunpowder to the Basotho king Moshoeshoe I. His fellow burghers found this an unwise move, over-friendly and potentially dangerous for the survival of the new state. Relations between the Boers and the Basotho were less than cordial at the time. A greater sin than the gift itself was the fact that Hoffman had tried to hide it from the Volksraad, the Orange Free State parliament.

Hoffman was asked to step down but refused. Commandant Johan Fick was asked to lead 1,200 men to the presidential residence to ask Hoffman to step down. He first refused, but once Fick setup cannons facing the residence, Hoffman agreed to leave the office and did so on 10 February 1854. He was succeeded by a (temporary) Presidential Executive Commission, chaired by the influential burgher J.J. Venter.

He died on his farm ('plaas') Slootkraal, District Wepener, Orange Free State on 13 October 1879.

See also
 Orange River Sovereignty
 Moshoeshoe I
 Basotho

Notes

References
 

Afrikaner people
People from the Free State (province)
State Presidents of the Orange Free State
1807 births
1879 deaths
Members of the Volksraad of the Orange Free State
Orange Free State independence activists